Chris Hatcher may refer to:

Chris Hatcher (American football) (born 1973), American football coach
Chris Hatcher (outfielder) (born 1969), American baseball player
Chris Hatcher (pitcher) (born 1985), American baseball player
 Chris Hatcher (psychologist) (1946–1999), clinical psychologist at the University of California, San Francisco